Arłamów Airport  is a former government airport in Arłamów, in the extreme southeast of Poland (near the Ukraine border), in gmina Bircza. The site of the airport is often referred to as Łodzinka Górna, Krajna, Trójca or Łomna (after nearby villages).

History
The airport was built in the late 1970s in the vicinity of a secret, luxurious, recreational complex called Arłamów. This exclusive, highly protected complex was situated in the midst of a heavily forested area that was accessible only with difficulty. Since it was highly popular among the chief representatives of the Polish Communist government easy access to the facilities was badly needed, from which the concept of building a nearby airfield emerged.

Finding a suitable place for the airport was not an easy task, since the surrounding terrain was hilly and densely forested. Finally, the engineers found a plateau on the grounds of the war-torn village of Krajna, 10 km NW of Arłamów. A 1193 m long and 35 m wide concrete/bitumen runway was built, thus enabling the party and government officials to land safely in propeller aircraft and small jets. Since the Arłamów complex also hosted special international guests arriving in big jets, they were instead flown to Rzeszów-Jasionka Airport and then driven to Arłamów.

Beside the runway, an apron was built, but no terminal was needed—the arriving officials were immediately picked up by limousines and driven to the hotel. The runway's direction is 16/34 at an elevation of 441 metres. 

Since the collapse of the Iron Curtain, Arłamów and the airport were both dissolved. In recent years the complex has re-opened as a tourist attraction, but the use of the airport has not been revived. Arłamów Airport is still there and in fairly good condition, but it is not maintained nor supervised. It is occasionally used for sport aviation, and chartered tourist flights, but landings are performed at one's own risk. More often, the runway is occupied by car-borne speed drivers.

External links
 Official site of Hotel Arłamów
 Google Satellite Imagery
 Proposal for the restoration of the airport

Airports in Poland
Defunct airports in Poland
Przemyśl County
Buildings and structures in Podkarpackie Voivodeship

ms:Lapangan Terbang Bircza